The 1979 Air Force Falcons football team represented the United States Air Force Academy in the 1979 NCAA Division I-A football season, their last as an Independent. Led by first–year head coach Ken Hatfield, Air Force played home games at Falcon Stadium in Colorado Springs, Colorado.

The Falcons lost their first eight games, then won two of three to finish at 2–9, and were outscored 127–253. 
The win over Army on November 3 broke an eleven-game losing streak.

Air Force joined the Western Athletic Conference in 1980.

Schedule

Roster

References

Air Force
Air Force Falcons football seasons
Air Force Falcons football